Bridge & Tunnel is a one-woman Broadway show, in which all of the roles are performed by stage actress Sarah Jones.  Jones explores the diverse immigrant makeup of the New York City boroughs outside Manhattan by playing a variety of different characters, each of a different race. The play comprises a series of monologues, in which each character takes the stage during a poetry reading and ends up talking about his or her life.

The play premiered Off-Broadway at the 45 Bleecker Street Theater on February 19, 2004 and closed on August 15, 2004. It won the 2003–04 Obie Award, Outstanding Performance. The play opened on Broadway at the Helen Hayes Theatre on January 13, 2006 in previews, officially on January 26, 2006, and closed on August 6, 2006 after 213 performances. The play won the Special Tony Award at the 2006 Tony Awards.

References

External links
Voices on Antisemitism Interview with Sarah Jones from the U.S. Holocaust Memorial Museum
Internet Broadway Database listing
Interview on PBS, August 6, 2004
theatremania article, January 12, 2006

Plays for one performer
Monodrama
2004 plays
American plays